USS Sequoyah (SP-426), later USS SP-426, was a United States Navy patrol vessel in commission from 1917 to 1919.

Sequoyah was built as a private motorboat of the same name in 1907 by Crockett of Pocomoke City, Maryland. On 24 August 1917, the U.S. Navy chartered her from her owner, Albert T. Lavallette of Hampton, Virginia, for use as a section patrol boat during World War I. She was commissioned as USS Sequoyah (SP-426) the same day.

Sequoyah was used for transporting ammunition and supplies in the harbor at Norfolk, Virginia, for the rest of World War I. In 1918, she was renamed USS SP-426.

SP-426 was decommissioned and returned to her owner on 29 January 1919.

References

NavSource Online: Section Patrol Craft Photo Archive: Sequoyah (SP 426)

Patrol vessels of the United States Navy
World War I patrol vessels of the United States
Ships built in Pocomoke City, Maryland
1907 ships